Hernán Alvarado Solano (January 26, 1946 – January 31, 2011) was the  Catholic bishop of the  Catholic Vicar Apostolic of Guapi, Colombia.
As a young boy he studied at the Minor Seminary Nuestra Señora de la Asunción of Zipaquirá. He was a quiet boy with a strong and firm character. He was observant of the world around him.
He studied philosophy and theology at the Major Seminary of Bogotá.

Ordained in 1971, Hernán Alvarado Solano was appointed bishop of the Vicar Apostolic of Guapi in 2001 and died as the bishop of his mission territory, a remote area of Colombia, cultural and politically.

Notes

21st-century Roman Catholic bishops in Colombia
1946 births
2011 deaths
Major Seminary of Bogotá alumni
Roman Catholic bishops of Guapi